The Minnesota African American Heritage Museum and Gallery (MAAHMG) is a museum and gallery dedicated to the art, history and culture of African American people in Minnesota, United States. Located in Minneapolis, the museum was founded in 2018, and offers free admission.

Facility and founding
The logo is one of the West African Adinkra symbols: for 'ram’s horns', meaning humility and strength.

Civil rights attorney/writer Tina Burnside and education administrator Coventry Cowens met in 2017, and together, in September 2018, the two founded MAAHMG as one of the state's first African American history museums.

Exhibits
The inaugural exhibit, Unbreakable: Celebrating the Resilience of African Americans in Minnesota, looked at the effect of the Great Migration on Minnesota. Grace ran from November 2018 through January 2019, and showcased women's hats, sometimes called "church hats," that enslaved Black women were allowed to wear for Sunday church services.

In July 2020, the museum organized a mural along a block of Plymouth Avenue, in which "Black Lives Matter" was painted in -high letters, a different artist painting each letter. The mural was completed in support of protests for racial justice after the murder of George Floyd. From August through December 2020, the museum presented A Reckoning: 100 Years after the Lynchings in Duluth, commemorating the lynching of Elias Clayton, Elmer Jackson, and Isaac McGhie in 1920. In 2022, the museum presented Early African Americans of Southeast Minnesota by historian Mica Anders, and several public online events in February for Black History Month.

The collection includes a Green Book, which helped black travelers to find food and lodging. A black innovation exhibit features architect Clarence Wigington, and Reatha King, the former General Mills executive who earlier developed tubing for Apollo 11.

Notes

External links
 

Art museums and galleries in Minnesota
Arts organizations based in Minneapolis
Culture of Minneapolis
Museums in Minneapolis